Spiny spider or spined spider is a common name for several species of spiders that exhibit spine-like projections on their body. It usually refers to:

Austracantha minax, the Australian jewel spider or Christmas spider
Gasteracantha, the spiny orb-weavers

It may also refer to:
Micrathena
Micrathena gracilis, the spined micrathena
Poecilopachys
Poecilopachys australasia, the two-spined spider
Thelacantha

See also
Maja squinado, the spiny spider crab
Libinia emarginata, the nine-spined spider crab

Set index articles on spiders